State Route 261 (SR 261) is a primary state highway in the U.S. state of Virginia. Known as Statler Boulevard, the state highway runs  from U.S. Route 11 (US 11) north to Coalter Street within the independent city of Staunton. SR 261 is an unsigned four-lane divided highway that provides an eastern truck bypass of downtown Staunton. The state highway is marked along much of its route as U.S. Route 11 Truck and US 250 Truck.

Route description

SR 261 begins an intersection with US 11 (Greenville Avenue) and unnumbered Old Greenville Road southeast of downtown Staunton. This intersection is also the southern terminus of US 11 Truck. The four-lane divided highway intersects US 250 (Richmond Road), where the state highway also begins to run concurrently with US 250 Truck. SR 261 crosses over CSX's North Mountain Subdivision and curves west to intersect SR 254 (New Hope Road), the Chesapeake Western Railway, and US 11 (Commerce Road). At the US 11 intersection, US 11 Truck reaches its northern terminus and US 250 Truck turns north onto US 11. US 250 Truck follows US 11 and SR 262 north and west to reconnect with US 250 northwest of Staunton. SR 261 continues west to its northern terminus at the intersection of North Coalter Street and Edgewood Road northeast of downtown Staunton.

Major intersections

References

External links

Virginia Highways Project: VA 261

261
State Route 261
U.S. Route 11
U.S. Route 250